Lindsay Davenport was the defending champion, but withdrew due to a lower-back strain.

Mary Pierce won in the final, defeating Ai Sugiyama 6–0, 6–3.

Seeds
The top eight seeds received a bye into the second round.

Draw

Finals

Top half

Section 1

Section 2

Bottom half

Section 3

Section 4

External links
 ITF tournament draws

Southern California Open
Acura Classic - Singles